Bumpe–Gao Chiefdom, also known as Bumpeh ngawo  or Bumpe ngao is a chiefdom in Bo District of Sierra Leone. Its capital is Bumpe.

climate
The climate is that of a Monsoon The average temperature is   °C.  The hottest month is April, at °C, and the coldest is July, at  °C. The average rainfall is  millimeters per year.   The wettest month is September, with  millimeters of rain, and the driest is January, with   millimeters.

Ethnic makeup and culture
This chiefdom is inhabited by different ethnic groups,which are the  Temnes, Mendes and the Sherbros. Residents trace
their origin to a warrior named Bandabla Jei, a successful hunter and fisherman, who came from
the east with a hunting party and established himself as a local leader. Jei later left as
other stronger invaders won against him and took over the chiefdom. He is said to have left in a canoe down the river.

Ruling families
The chiefdom is ruled by five recognized ruling families.

Gbekpa/Barka
This house traces the lineage of Barka, one of the many sons of Gbekpa.All other houses trace their legitimacy to connections with this house. Its headquarters is at
Bumpe.

Kposowa family
The great grandfather of the Kposowa family was an advisor to Gbekpa, and given legitimacy
because of his service. The current chief is from this familiy, and makes his headquarters in
Bumpe.

Jongo 
This house traces the lineage of a cousin to Barka, and also has its headquarters in
Bumpe.

Kpandoma 
The great grandfather of this line was cousin to the Bakar, and they also have
their headquarters in Bumpeh.

Makavoray
This family is also related to Barka, and has its headquarter at Serabu.

See also
Sarah Culberson:Princess of the mende chiefdom of Kposowa.

References 

Chiefdoms of Sierra Leone
Southern Province, Sierra Leone